Mahendra Engineering College (Autonomous) is an Engineering College in the Indian state of Tamil Nadu. It teaches engineering subjects for approximately 10,000 students pursuing the Bachelor of Engineering and/or MBAs. The college offers undergraduate programs in the disciplines of mechanical, civil, EEE, ECE, EIE, CSE, IT, MAE (Mechanical and Automation), petrochemical, food technology, chemical, pharmaceutical, MCT (Mechatronics) and Aeronautical engineering and postgraduate programs in Mechanical, Electrical and Communication fields along with the MBA and the MCA.

Facilities 
The college is located on a 250-acre campus. It has bus facilities for commuting students and 25 km from Salem and 15 km from Tiruchengode.

History 
Shri M.G.Barath Kumar is the founder and the chairman. The college was established in 1995.

Demographics 
Students are from Tamil Nadu, Kerala, Andhra Pradesh, Uttar Pradesh, Bihar, Delhi, Rajasthan, Manipur, the Andaman and Nicobar islands etc., and other countries.  The students are provided with food through a subsidized catering system, and hostel occupancy with separate hostels for girls and boys, graduate and post-graduate students, and newcomers. The hostel complex is situated inside the Mahendra combined campus only.

The college is known for its support to students from all classes of the society. Scholarships and other monetary supports are offered to students in need. The fee structure of the college is determined as per the Anna University-decided fee system. Special support and encouragement are given to students who excel in academics.

Approval & Affiliation 

A Pioneer in Technical Education in South India was established by the Mahendra Educational Trust which has been offering education since the 1980s..

 Approved by All India Council for Technical Education (AICTE), Government of India.
 Affiliated to Anna University, Tamil Nadu, India (A University of international repute)
 Autonomous Institution.
 Accredited by NAAC with 'A' Grade
 Approved by UGC under 2(f) and 12(B) sections.
 Certified ISO 9001:2008 by BSI Quality International.
 accredited by NBA TIER-1 (Washington Accord) for UG: (CSE, ECE, EEE)

Courses 
Mechanical engineering 
civil engineering 
Computer science and engineering
Information technology
Electrical and Electronic engineering 
Electronics and communication engineering
Electronics and Instrumentation engineering
Mechatronics engineering
Mechanical and Automation engineering
Agriculture engineering
Aeronautical engineering
Food technology 
Chemical engineering
Petrochemical engineering
pharmaceutical engineering

U.G. Programmes offered (Bachelor's degree)

B.E. / B.Tech. Degree Programmes
Aeronautical Engineering
Agricultural Engineering
Civil Engineering
Computer Science and Engineering
Electronics and Communication Engineering
Electrical and Electronics Engineering
Electronics and Instrumentation Engineering
Information Technology
Mechanical and Automation Engineering
Mechanical Engineering
Mechatronics Engineering
Petrochemical Engineering
Food technology
Pharmaceutical engineering
Chemical engineering
Top Engineering College in Tamilnadu

P.G. Programmes Offered (Master's degree)

M.E. / M.Tech. Degree Programmes 
Communication & Networking (Computer and Communication Engineering)
Communication System Engineering
Computer Aided Design
Computer Science and Engineering
Control Systems
Structural Engineering
VLSI Design (Digital Communication and Networking).

MBA Degree Programmes  
Master of Business Administration.

MCA Degree Programmes  
Master of Computer Application.

Activities

National Cadet Corps 
The National Cadet Corps unit 5 (TN) Air Squadron (Tech) Indian Air Force (Air Wing)  Unit, Salem formed in this institution in 2006 with a sanctioned intake of 50 cadets for (Senior Division/Senior Wing). The activity of the NCC unit for any academic year is scheduled of training as per the motto of NCC, which includes Foot Drill & Arms Drill, Weapon Training, Firing and Social service. During the Training the cadets undergo at least one (Unit/State/National) level camp, Cadets get eligibility to take the "B" and "C" certificate exams.

Mahendra is equipped with several infrastructural facilities for NCC training program and provides opportunities by way of conducting firing and drill practices, personality development and voluntary service programmes.

References

Engineering colleges in Tamil Nadu
Education in Namakkal district
Educational institutions established in 1995
1995 establishments in Tamil Nadu